The Synagogue of Arcachon is a Jewish synagogue located at 36 Avenue Gambetta in Arcachon, Nouvelle-Aquitaine, France.

History 
Construction of a synagogue in the area was financed by eccentric industrialist Daniel Iffla of Bordeaux, who went by the name Osiris. The synagogue was opened on December 21, 1879, when Osiris' niece, singer Emma Moyse, married Sigismund Bardac., Osiris donated the building to the Israelite Regional Consistory of Bordeaux, itself a member of the Central Israelite Consistory of France.

The location was strategically chosen, as it is on the street leading from the Thiers Jetty and the Rail station in Arcachon. In 1895,Daniel Iffla built the "Alexandre-Dumas villa" in the style of other Villas in Arcachon, at 1 allée Brémontier in Arcachon, about a 10 minutewalk from the synagogue.

During a round-up of Jews on January 10, 1944, organized by French collaborator Maurice Papon, 12 Jews from Arcachon were arrested. They were originally brought to the Grand Synagogue of Bordeaux before later being transported by train with 305 other Jewish prisoners to Drancy internment camp, and later to different Nazi concentration camps, where they were killed. The Normandy landings would happen only six months later.

In 2004, the building was added as one of the monuments historiques of France. It was renovated in 2011. Religious services are offered year round. Since 2012, the synagogue's rabbi has been Eric-Meyer Aziza, who is secretary-general of Jewish-Christian Friendship of France and is heavily involved in Interfaith dialogue.,.

Architecture 
The architect of the synagogue was Ferrand Stanislas. It was built in a rectangle, meant to invoke the style of classic synagogues from the 19th century.

Inside, the Torah ark is semi-circular area inspired by Tuscan style and decorated with Bezants. Along the sides of the Ark are replicas of the stone tablets of the Ten Commandments. The bimah is in the middle of the nave, as is customary with Sephardic Judaism.

On the facade, the upper part of the gable, held by two pillars has an engraving that saysThe verse, which is frequently cited by Jesus to his Disciples speaks to the importance of interfaith dialogue to the community. Above the engraving is another representation of the Stone Tablets of the Ten Commandments. The two tablets are headed with the initials  for République française, affirming support for the then-Third Republic.

References

Bibliography 

 Le Patrimoine des Communes de la Gironde, Flohic Éditions, deux volumes, Paris 2001,.

Related articles 

 Histoire des Juifs dits portugais en France
 Grande synagogue de Bordeaux
 Daniel Iffla Osiris

External links 

 

Religious buildings and structures completed in 1877
Synagogues in France
Buildings and structures in Gironde